Daglan is a commune in the Dordogne department in Nouvelle-Aquitaine in southwestern France.

Geography
The village lies on the left bank of the Céou, which flows northwest through the commune.

Population

See also
Communes of the Dordogne department

References

Communes of Dordogne